Nadine Horchler (born 21 June 1986) is a German former biathlete. During the 2016–17 Biathlon World Cup season she won the 12.5 km Mass Start race at Rasen-Antholz.  She won gold in the 7.5 km sprint at the 2016 IBU Open European Championships.

References

1986 births
Living people
German female biathletes
People from Bad Arolsen
Sportspeople from Kassel (region)
21st-century German women